Don't Say No is the debut extended play by South Korean singer Seohyun. It was released by SM Entertainment on January 17, 2017. The EP marked the official solo debut of Seohyun, who had been known as a member of South Korean girl group Girls' Generation for ten years.

Composition 
The EP consists of seven tracks, of which six were written by Seohyun. Talking about the EP, she said, "The theme of the album is love. I want to show 100% of my emotions by writing all the songs because [SM Entertainment] is so strict; I have to say that I have had to adhere to the concept at all times being part of Girls' Generation." The opening track "Don't Say No" is a R&B and dance pop song featuring a "funky" piano rhythm. Songs "Hello", "Magic", and "Lonely Love" are inspired by 1990s pop and R&B genres. "Love & Affection" features piano and bass, while "Bad Love" is a mid-tempo track, and "Moonlight" is an uptempo number.

Release and promotion
On January 10, 2017, Seohyun was announced to be debuting as a solo singer with Don't Say No, becoming the third Girls' Generation member to have released a solo album, after Taeyeon and Tiffany. On January 13, the album's track list was released, revealing that South Korean singer Eric Nam was featured on one of the tracks. A promotional showcase for the album, where Seohyun performed "Magic", "Lonely Love" and "Don't Say No" for the first time, was held at SM Coex Artium in Seoul on January 16. Don't Say No and the title track's music video were released digitally on January 17. The next day, physical copies became available at retail outlets.

Seohyun performed on South Korean weekly music TV shows from January 19 to 22. She later held a residency show titled Love, Still – Seohyun, part of The Agit series of residency shows by SM Entertainment artists, at SM Coex Artium from February 24 to 26 to promote the EP.

Commercial performance
Don't Say No debuted atop the South Korean Gaon Album Chart and reached number three on the Billboard World Albums Chart. It later placed at number five on the Gaon Album Chart for the month of January 2017 with 33,041 physical copies sold.

Track listing

Charts

Weekly charts

Monthly charts

Sales

Accolades

Release history

See also 
 Seohyun discography
 List of M Countdown Chart winners (2017)

References

External links 
 

SM Entertainment EPs
Korean-language EPs
2017 EPs
Contemporary R&B EPs